2005 Universiade may refer to:

2005 Summer Universiade, a summer sporting event held in Izmir, Turkey
2005 Winter Universiade, a winter sporting event held in Innsbruck, Austria